Pasquale J. DeBaise (August 13, 1926 – February 17, 2022) was an American businessman and politician.

DeBaise was born in Wallingford, Connecticut. He served in the United States Navy during World War II. DeBaise owned a heating and air conditioning business in Wallingford. He served in the Connecticut House of Representatives from 1967 to 1973 and was a Democrat. He died in Wallingford, Connecticut on February 17, 2022, at the age of 95.

References

1926 births
2022 deaths
20th-century American politicians
Businesspeople from Connecticut
Democratic Party members of the Connecticut House of Representatives
People from Wallingford, Connecticut
Military personnel from Connecticut